Iñaki Montes de la Torre (born 3 October 2002) is a Spanish tennis player.

Montes de la Torre has a career high ATP singles ranking of 538 achieved on 25 July 2022. He also has a career high doubles ranking of 772 achieved on 18 July 2022.

Montes de la Torre has won 1 ATP Challenger doubles title at the 2022 Open Castilla y León with Nicolás Álvarez Varona.

Montes de la Torre played college tennis at the University of Virginia.

Tour titles

Doubles

References

External links
 
 

2002 births
Living people
Spanish male tennis players
Sportspeople from Pamplona
Virginia Cavaliers men's tennis players
21st-century Spanish people